The 2022 Dunedin mayoral election between 16 September and 8 October 2022 was part of the 2022 New Zealand local elections. Voters preferred former city councillor Jules Radich to the incumbent Aaron Hawkins.

The Mayor's role is  'to provide leadership to the other elected members of the territorial authority, be a leader in the community and perform civic duties'. Voting was held using Single Transferable Vote (STV). Ballots were accepted until midday on 8 October by post or by dropping off completed voting papers. The mayoral election was combined with elections for the Dunedin City Council, Community Boards, and the Otago Regional Council.

Candidates

Declared candidates
Policies are outlined in candidate profiles  and policies on major issues.

Bill Acklin, former city councillor
Sophie Barker, city councillor
Jett Groshinski
Aaron Hawkins, incumbent mayor
Carmen Houlahan, city councillor
Mandy Mayhem-Bullock, Waikouaiti Coast Community Board member
David Milne
Jules Radich, city councillor
Rich Seager
Lee Vandervis, city councillor
Pamela Taylor

Declined to be candidates
David Benson-Pope, city councillor (endorsed Hawkins)
Clare Curran, former Labour MP
Christine Garey, deputy mayor (endorsed Hawkins)
Jim O'Malley, city councillor
Ian Taylor, businessman
Steve Walker, city councillor (endorsed Hawkins)
Andrew Whiley, city councillor (endorsed Radich)
Michael Woodhouse, National MP

Results

See also
2022 Dunedin local elections

References

Mayoral elections in Dunedin
Dunedin
Dunedin